The 2008 Czech and Slovak Figure Skating Championships were held on December 14–16, 2007 in Trenčín, Slovakia. Skaters competed in the disciplines of men's singles, ladies' singles, and ice dancing on the senior and junior levels.

The two national championships were held simultaneously and the results were then split by country. The top three skaters from each country formed their national podiums. Therefore, there are no medal colors on the table below because it shows the combined overall results. The table can be sorted by country. This was the second consecutive season that the Czech and Slovak Championships were held simultaneously.

The senior compulsory dance was the Yankee Polka and the junior compulsory dance was the Cha-Cha Congelado.

Medals summary

Czech Republic

Slovakia

Senior results

Men

Ladies

Ice dancing

Junior results

Ice dancing

Slovak Junior Championships
The 2008 Slovak Junior Championships were held on February 16–17, 2008 in Zimny stadion O.Nepelu hala II. Skaters competed in the disciplines of men's singles, ladies' singles, and pair skating on the junior level.

Men

Ladies

Pairs

External links
 2008 Czech and Slovak Championships results
 2008 Slovak Junior Championships results

2007 in figure skating
Czech And Slovak Figure Skating Championships, 2008
Czech Figure Skating Championships
Slovak Figure Skating Championships
Czech Republic–Slovakia relations
2008 in Czech sport
2008 in Slovak sport